Four Crosses is the name of several places:
Four Crosses, Denbighshire, Wales
Four Crosses, Flintshire, Wales
Four Crosses, Isle of Anglesey, Wales
Four Crosses, Llandysilio, Powys, Wales
Four Crosses, Llanfair Caereinion, Powys, Wales 
Four Crosses, Staffordshire, England
Four Crosses, Wrexham, Wales